The Independent Spirit Award for Best Supporting Performance is one of the annual awards given out by Film Independent, a non-profit organization dedicated to independent film and independent filmmakers. In 2022, the Independent Spirit Awards announced that the four acting categories would be retired and replaced with two gender neutral categories, with both Best Supporting Male and Best Supporting Female merging into the Best Supporting Performance category.

Nominees

2020s

References

External links
https://www.filmindependent.org/spirit-awards/

Independent Spirit Awards
American film awards
Film awards for supporting actor